Mexicana Universal Zacatecas is a pageant in Zacatecas, Mexico, that selects that state's representative for the national Mexicana Universal pageant.

The State Organization hasn't had a national winner in Nuestra Belleza México. In 2009 a beauty queen has been dethroned, Verónica Llamas for posing topless in a magazine for men, so breaking a clause in the contract of Nuestra Belleza México, she also lost the right to represent Mexico in Miss Continente Americano 2010.

Titleholders
Below are the names of the annual titleholders of Nuestra Belleza Zacatecas 1994-2016, Mexicana Universal Zacatecas 2017, and their final placements in the Mexicana Universal.

 Competed in Miss Universe.
 Competed in Miss International.
 Competed in Miss Charm International.
 Competed in Miss Continente Americano.
 Competed in Reina Hispanoamericana.
 Competed in Miss Orb International.
 Competed in Nuestra Latinoamericana Universal.

Designated Contestants
As of 2000, it isn't uncommon for some States to have more than one delegate competing simultaneously in the national pageant. The following Nuestra Belleza Zacatecas contestants were invited to compete in Nuestra Belleza México. Some have placed higher than the actual State winners.

External links
Official Website
Facebook

Nuestra Belleza México